Chris Williams is a Welsh cyclist who represented Wales in the 1998 Commonwealth Games in Kuala Lumpur, riding the road race and the team pursuit, where he finished fourth.

Palmarès

1998
2nd British National Circuit Race Championships
4th Team Pursuit, Commonwealth Games

References

Welsh male cyclists
Commonwealth Games competitors for Wales
Cyclists at the 1998 Commonwealth Games
Year of birth missing (living people)
Living people
Place of birth missing (living people)